Paris Henken (born December 22, 1995) is an American competitive sailor. She competed at the 2016 Summer Olympics in Rio de Janeiro, in the women's 49erFX.

She learned to sail at the Coronado Yacht Club in the Naples Sabot class. She was runner-up at the 2011 High School Sailing National Championships with Coronado High School, and bronze medallist at the 2015 Pan American Games. In 2021 she won the ICSA Women's Dinghy National Championship with the College of Charleston.

References

1995 births
Living people
American female sailors (sport)
Olympic sailors of the United States
Sailors at the 2016 Summer Olympics – 49er FX
Pan American Games medalists in sailing
Pan American Games bronze medalists for the United States
Sailors at the 2015 Pan American Games
Medalists at the 2015 Pan American Games
College of Charleston Cougars sailors